Black Road is a Viking comic book series written by Brian Wood and published by Image Comics, with art by Garry Brown. Set during the Viking Age in Norway, it follows the story of the main character, Magnus the Black.

References